Robert Allison was a member of the South Dakota House of Representatives.

Biography
Allison was born on March 14, 1846, near Summit Center, Wisconsin, now in the village of Summit, in Waukesha County, Wisconsin. Allison was a sailor on the Great Lakes and later moved to Dakota Territory to help his brothers build houses. Allison was in farming and stock raising. He died on October 15, 1924, and is buried in Brookings, South Dakota.

Career
Allison was a member of the House of Representatives from 1895 to 1896. He was a Republican and lived in Cavour, South Dakota.

References

People from Beadle County, South Dakota
People from Summit, Waukesha County, Wisconsin
Republican Party members of the South Dakota House of Representatives
1846 births
1924 deaths